Alexander Konstantinovch Sheller (11 August 1838, Saint Petersburg, Russian Empire, – 4 December 1900, Saint Petersburg, Russian Empire) was a Russian writer of Estonian and Polish origins. A regular contributor to Sovremennik, Delo and Russkoye Slovo, Sheller published numerous stories, poems, translations, articles and essays, often using the pseudonym A.Mikhaylov, and is sometimes referred to as A.K. Sheller-Mikhaylov. His best-known novel was Gnilyie bolota (Putrid Moors, 1864), followed by Zhizn Shupova (The Life of Shupov, 1865) and Staryie gnyozda (Old Nests, 1875). The Complete Works of A.K. Sheller-Mikhaylov in 15 volumes came out in 1895.

References 

Writers from Saint Petersburg
1838 births
1900 deaths